Sangham is a 1954 Indian Telugu-language romantic comedy film, produced by M. Murugan, M. Saravanan and M. Kumaran of AVM Productions and directed by M. V. Raman. It stars Vyjayanthimala, Anjali Devi, N. T. Rama Rao and S. Balachander, with music composed by R. Sudarsanam.

Plot 
The film is a tale of two besties, Rani & Kamini. Rani is a feminist to the core. Kamini's father Ramanatham, a man of progressive views, had married a woman from another caste and so finds it difficult to get a groom for his daughter. One day, Rani & Kamini have an altercation with medicos Raja & Chandram. Raja is attracted by Kamini's simplicity and beauty, while Chandram falls for Rani. Raja's father Seetharamanjaneya Das wants his son to marry the girl of his choice, but the mother Abbayamma counters her husband's views. Raja marries Kamini without informing his parents. Due to a plot hatched by Yeka Kannaiah, who has an eye on Kamini, Raja misunderstands her and, in a fit of anger, agrees to marry the girl of his father's choice. And this girl is none other than Rani, who, not knowing that Kamini had married Raja, agrees to marry him. Just then Chandram steps in and the story ends on a happy note with Raja realizing his folly, a changed Seetharamanjaneya Das accepting Kamini as his daughter-in-law and Rani marrying Chandram.

Cast 
Vyjayanthimala as Rani
Anjali Devi as Kamini
N. T. Rama Rao as Raja
S. Balachander as Chandram
S. V. Ranga Rao as Seetharamanjaneya Das
V. Nagayya as Ramanatham
Ramana Reddy as Yeka Kannaiah
S. V. Sahasranamam as Sundaram
R. Balasubramaniam as Colonel Mallikarjuna Rao
Rushyendramani as Abbayamma
Hemalatha Tammarapi as Rani's mother

Production 
Sangham was produced by A. V. Meiyappan, the founder of AVM Productions. It was simultaneously shot in Hindi as Ladki and in Tamil as Penn. Vyjayanthimala appeared as the female lead in all three versions. N. T. Rama Rao was cast in the role done by Bharat Bhushan in the Hindi version and Gemini Ganesan in the Tamil version.

Soundtrack 
Music composed by R. Sudarsanam. Lyrics were written by Tholeti.

Box office 
The film became hit at the box office due to the Vyjayanthimala fan craze.

References

External links 
 

1950s romantic comedy-drama films
1950s Telugu-language films
1954 films
Films directed by M. V. Raman
Indian black-and-white films
Indian romantic comedy-drama films
Films scored by R. Sudarsanam